Colocasia with lamb this dish commonly eaten in Cyprus. Ingredients include kolokas (taro), lamb chunks, onion, lemon juice, flour, butter, salt.

See also
 List of lamb dishes

External links

Cypriot cuisine

Lamb dishes